Honjaram is a village in Srikakulam district of the Indian state of Andhra Pradesh. It is located in Santhakaviti mandal.

References 

Villages in Srikakulam district